David Alberto Guzmán Pérez (born 18 February 1990) is a Costa Rican professional footballer who plays as a defensive midfielder for Liga FPD club Saprissa and the Costa Rica national team.

Club career
Guzmán made his debut for Saprissa in 2009 and stayed with the club for 7 years. On 22 December 2016, he joined MLS team Portland Timbers.

On May 6, 2019, Guzman was traded to Columbus Crew SC in exchange for an international roster slot.

International career
Guzmán played at the 2007 FIFA U-17 World Cup and in the 2009 FIFA U-20 World Cup, where the Costa Rica national under-20 football team, came 4th after losing to Hungary in the match for the 3rd place.

He made his senior debut for Costa Rica in an October 2010 friendly match against Peru. He represented his country at the 2011 Copa América and was a non-playing squad member at the 2011 CONCACAF Gold Cup.

In May 2018 he was named in Costa Rica's 23-man squad for the 2018 FIFA World Cup in Russia.

Career statistics

Club

International

Honours
Saprissa
 Liga FPD (8): Clausura 2010, Clausura 2014, Apertura 2014, Apertura 2015, Apertura 2016, Clausura 2020, Clausura 2021, Apertura 2022
 Costa Rican Cup (1): 2013

References

External links

Living people
1990 births
Costa Rican footballers
People from San José Province
Footballers from San José, Costa Rica
Association football midfielders
Deportivo Saprissa players
Portland Timbers players
Portland Timbers 2 players
Columbus Crew players
Liga FPD players
Major League Soccer players
USL Championship players
Costa Rica under-20 international footballers
Costa Rica international footballers
2009 CONCACAF U-20 Championship players
2011 Copa Centroamericana players
2011 CONCACAF Gold Cup players
2011 Copa América players
2015 CONCACAF Gold Cup players
2017 Copa Centroamericana players
2017 CONCACAF Gold Cup players
2018 FIFA World Cup players
2021 CONCACAF Gold Cup players
Expatriate soccer players in the United States
Costa Rican expatriates in the United States